Saratoga National Historical Park is a United States National Historical Park located in the Town of Stillwater in eastern New York, 30 miles north of Albany. 
The park preserves the site of the Battles of Saratoga.

Description

The park preserves the site of the Battles of Saratoga, the first significant American military victory of the American Revolutionary War. Here in 1777, American forces met, defeated, and forced a major British army to surrender, an event which led France to recognize the independence of the United States, and enter the war as a decisive military ally of the struggling Americans.

First authorized as a New York state historic preserve in 1927 on the sesquicentennial of the Battles, the Battlefield was made part of the National Park System in 1938 when Saratoga National Historical Park was authorized by the United States Congress.

The Visitors Center offers a 20-minute orientation film, fiber-optic light map, timeline and artifact displays. A brochure is available for a self-guided tour of sites in the  battlefield in Stillwater. It is a restored house museum open by tour. The Saratoga Battle Monument is in the nearby village of Victory.

The park is located on the upper Hudson River southeast of Saratoga Springs. It contains the famous Boot Monument to Benedict Arnold, the only war memorial in the United States that does not bear the name of its honoree. The memorial was donated by John Watts de Peyster, a former major general for the New York State Militia during the American Civil War who wrote several military histories about the Battle of Saratoga.

Saratoga Surrender Site Memorial Park

In 2021, management of the site where the British Army surrendered was transferred to the National Park Service. The Saratoga Surrender Site Memorial Park marks the precise location where British General John Burgoyne surrendered his army to General Horatio Gates on October 17, 1777. The 19-acre park is located nine miles north of the Saratoga Battlefield Park, and a half mile south of Schuylerville on U.S. Route 4. The park includes explanatory plaques and signage, and two cannon.

The land is owned by the Open Space Institute and managed by the National Park Service, and is open to visitors from dawn to dusk year-round.

Nearby Battles of Saratoga locations not included in the SNHP

It was made famous by Baroness Frederika Riedesel in her Letters and Journals relating to the War of the American Revolution, and the Capture of the German Troops at Saratoga. This house was built in 1770–1773.

During the closing days of the Battles of Saratoga, Baroness Riedesel sheltered there together with the wives of officers of the British army and wounded personnel. Her account of the travails of those around her, her keen insight into the personalities of the principal officers of both the British and American armies and her devotion to her husband in peril have led some commentators to name her as the first woman war correspondent. The Marshall House was bombarded by the Americans who supposed it an enemy headquarters.

Within are conserved cannonballs and other reminders of the ordeal suffered by those who took refuge there. The Marshall House is the sole surviving structure in the battles' area. The property is privately owned.

Gallery

References

Further reading
 Lossing, Benson J. Pictorial Field-Book of the Revolution, I. 1850.
 Stone, William L., translator. Letters and Journals relating to the War of the American Revolution, and the Capture of the German Troops at Saratoga, by Mrs. General Riedesel. Joel Munsell, Albany, N.Y., 1867.

External links

National Park Service: Saratoga National Historical Park
Saratoga: The Tide Turns on the Frontier, a National Park Service Teaching with Historic Places (TwHP) lesson plan
The Marshall House website

American Revolutionary War sites
National Historical Parks of the United States
New York (state) in the American Revolution
Parks on the National Register of Historic Places in New York (state)
Historic house museums in New York (state)
History museums in New York (state)
Museums in Saratoga County, New York
Protected areas established in 1938
American Revolutionary War museums in New York (state)
National Park Service areas in New York (state)
National parks of the Appalachians
Parks in Saratoga County, New York
Champlain Valley National Heritage Area
Hudson River Valley National Heritage Area
1938 establishments in New York (state)
National Register of Historic Places in Saratoga County, New York
American Revolution on the National Register of Historic Places